The Moscow State Symphony Orchestra (MSSO) is a Russian orchestra, based in Moscow.  The orchestra gives concerts primarily at the Great Hall of the Moscow Conservatory, and at the Tchaikovsky Concert Hall.  As well, the orchestra gives concerts in the Great Hall of the Saint-Petersburg D.D. Shostakovich Philharmonic Society, as well as in other Russian cities.

The orchestra was founded in 1943 under the auspices of the government of the then-USSR.  Lev Steinberg was the orchestra's first chief conductor, until his death in 1945.  Successive chief conductors have included Nikolai Anosov (1945–1950), Leo Ginzburg (1950–1954), Mikhail Terian (1954 – 1960), Veronica Dudarova (1960–1989), Pavel Kogan (1989-2022).

Chief conductors
 Lev Steinberg (1943–1945)
 Nikolai Anosov (1945–1950)
 Leo Ginzburg (1950–1954)
 Mikhail Terian (1954–1960)
 Veronica Dudarova (1960–1989)
 Pavel Kogan (1989–2022)

References

External links
 Official homepage of the MSSO (Russian-language)

Musical groups established in 1943
Russian symphony orchestras